1963 college football season may refer to:

 1963 NCAA University Division football season
 1963 NCAA College Division football season
 1963 NAIA football season